Mango Hill East railway station is one of the two stations (the other being Mango Hill railway station) located on the Redcliffe Peninsula railway line serving the suburb of Mango Hill in the Moreton Bay Region, Queensland, Australia. The station opened on 4 October 2016.

Until December 2012, it was going to be named Kinsellas Road until renamed to conform with TransLink's policy of naming stations after where they are located.

Services
Mango Hill East is served by trains operating from Kippa-Ring to Roma Street and Springfield Central. Some afternoon weekday services continue to Ipswich.

Services by platform

Transport links

Hornibrook Bus Lines operates one route near Mango Hill East Station on Anzac Avenue via footpath access on Capestone Boulevard.
680: Redcliffe to Chermside bus station

References

Railway stations in Moreton Bay Region
Railway stations in Australia opened in 2016
Mango Hill, Queensland